Ischionodonta colombiana' is a species of beetle in the family Cerambycidae. It was described by Napp and Marques in 1999.

References

Ischionodonta
Beetles described in 1999